John Prince (born 7 January 1969) is a Saint Lucian cricketer. He played in three first-class and three List A matches for the Windward Islands in 1992/93.

See also
 List of Windward Islands first-class cricketers

References

External links
 

1969 births
Living people
Saint Lucian cricketers
Windward Islands cricketers